Gdynia Stocznia railway station is a railway station serving the city of Gdynia, in the Pomeranian Voivodeship, Poland. The station opened in 1951 and is located on the Gdańsk Śródmieście–Rumia railway. The train services are operated by SKM Tricity.

In December 1970 a vicious riot took place on this stop and in the area between shipyard workers and communist militia and some people were killed.

The name of the stop (Stocznia: shipyard in English) is connected with the nearby Shipyard of Gdynia, and it was used mainly by its workers until its closure in 2009. The Gdynia Maritime University is also located within walking distance of this station.

Train services
The station is served by the following services:

Szybka Kolej Miejska services (SKM) (Lębork -) Wejherowo - Reda - Rumia - Gdynia - Sopot - Gdansk

References 

 This article is based upon a translation of the Polish language version as of October 2016.

External links

Railway stations in Poland opened in 1951
Railway stations served by Szybka Kolej Miejska (Tricity)
Stocznia